Korai railway station is a railway station on the East Coast Railway network in the state of Odisha, India. It serves Korai town. Its code is KRIH. It has two platforms. Passenger, MEMU, Express trains halt at Korai railway station.

Major trains

 East Coast Express

See also
 Jajpur district

References

Railway stations in Jajpur district
Khurda Road railway division